Cord (also released as Hide and Seek) is a 2000 thriller film directed by Sidney J. Furie and starring Daryl Hannah, Jennifer Tilly, Bruce Greenwood, and Vincent Gallo.

Plot
After struggling with infertility, Anne (Daryl Hannah) finally succeeds in getting pregnant through invitro fertilization with her husband Jack (Bruce Greenwood). However, one night, Anne awakens to discover a masked intruder in her room. Terrified, Anne tries to escape, but the intruder chloroforms her into unconsciousness, rendering her helpless as he kidnaps her and takes her to an isolated house.

In the morning, Anne finds herself held captive by a couple named Frank (Vincent Gallo) and Helen (Jennifer Tilly). Helen has gone mad after her baby was aborted by Frank upon learning that it would have been born deformed. The procedure left her sterile, and he is now attempting to make it up to her by giving her Anne's baby. Anne recognizes Frank as a technician at her fertility clinic, and Helen later tells her that he secretly replaced her fertilized egg with one of Helen's instead. Frank stages a car accident with a horribly burned body to make everyone believe Anne is dead; Jack refuses to accept it and pressures the police to continue investigating, but after several months they dismiss his ideas.

After dealing with several escape attempts, Frank finds himself frustrated both with Helen's bipolar insanity and her refusal to have sex with him while she is "pregnant", and he attempts to force himself on Anne before being interrupted by Helen. Frank chases Anne outdoors while Helen terrorizes a diaper service saleswoman. Subsequently, Frank attempts a forcible amniocentesis, against Helen's wishes, and during the argument he lets it slip that he never switched her eggs. Helen snaps; she kills, dismembers, and cooks Frank's body. Her increasing madness leads her to threaten Anne with a caesarean section, and Anne finally manages to escape. She calls Jack from a nearby phone booth, but Helen runs it down with her truck in the middle of the call. Although she chases and shoots at Anne, Anne cuts her face with broken glass and runs, collapsing on the roadside where she is found by a local teenager.

The police still refuse to believe Jack's story, even after seeing the damage to the phone booth, so Jack travels to the house Anne described, only to be ambushed by Helen with a baseball bat. Helen then kills a nurse at the hospital and again kidnaps Anne to force her into having the baby. Helen decides to allow her to have a natural birth rather than a C-section, but Anne manages to break free, and after a violent struggle she wraps one of her chains around Helen's neck and strangles her. Helen rises up for one final shot but misses and dies. As the police take Helen's body away, Anne emerges from the house with Jack and her new baby.

Cast
 Daryl Hannah as Anne White
 Jennifer Tilly as Helen
 Bruce Greenwood as Jack
 Vincent Gallo as Frank

Reception
Nathan Rabin from The A.V. Club gave the film a very bad review, stating: "Director Sidney J. Furie's (Ladybugs, Iron Eagle 4) latest is bereft of suspense, but so full of embarrassing low points that it's impossible to single out just one. Who could choose between seeing Hannah force-fed against her will through a tube and watching Tilly yell at the grotesque doll baby she's attached to her stomach to simulate pregnancy? For that matter, who could choose between Gallo forcing a very-pregnant Hannah to run in front of his tractor as exercise and Tilly threatening to perform a makeshift caesarian on Hannah with a pair of sharp scissors? It all adds up to one of the most deeply unpleasant films in recent memory, ineptly executed schlock that's as fun to watch as videotaped footage of terrified real-life hostages blankly reiterating their captors' demands." Mitch from "The Video Vacuum" gave it two stars and wrote: "Hide and Seek has a solid enough premise. It's just that the script plays all its cards too soon and things fizzle out long before the finale. Fans of Tilly will want to check it out just to see her do her thing, but all in all, it's not worth seeking out."

References

External links
 

2000 films
2000 thriller films
Canadian thriller films
Fetal abduction in fiction
Films directed by Sidney J. Furie
2000s pregnancy films
Trimark Pictures films
Canadian pregnancy films
2000s English-language films
2000s Canadian films